The Right of Children to Free and Compulsory Education Act or Right to Education Act (RTE) is an Act of the Parliament of India enacted on 4 August 2009, which describes the modalities of the importance of free and compulsory education for children between the age of 6 to 14 years in India under Article 21A of the Indian Constitution. India became one of 135 countries to make education a fundamental right of every child when the act came into force on 1 April 2010. The title of the RTE Act incorporates the words ‘free and compulsory’. ‘Free education’ means that no child, other than a child who has been admitted by his or her parents to a school which is not supported by the appropriate Government, shall be liable to pay any kind of fee or charges or expenses which may prevent him or her from pursuing and completing elementary education. ‘Compulsory education’ casts an obligation on the appropriate Government and local authorities to provide and ensure admission, attendance and completion of elementary education by all children in the 6-14 age group. With this, India has moved forward to a rights based framework that casts a legal obligation on the Central and State Governments to implement this fundamental child right as enshrined in the Article 21A of the Constitution, in accordance with the provisions of the RTE Act.17.

History

Present Act has its history in the drafting of the Indian constitution at the time of Independence but is more specifically to the Constitutional Amendment of 2002 that included the Article 21A in the Indian constitution making Education a fundamental Right. This amendment, however, specified the need for a legislation to describe the mode of implementation of the same which necessitated the drafting of a separate Education Bill. It is the 86th amendment in the Indian Constitution.

A rough draft of the bill was prepared in year 2005. It caused considerable controversy due to its mandatory provision to provide 25% reservation for disadvantaged children in private schools. The sub-committee of the Central Advisory Board of Education which prepared the draft Bill held this provision as a significant prerequisite for creating a democratic and egalitarian society. Indian Law commission had initially proposed 50% reservation for disadvantaged students in private schools.

On 7 May 2014, The Supreme Court of India ruled that Right to Education Act is not applicable to Minority institutions.

Passage 

The bill was approved by the cabinet on 2 July 2009. Rajya Sabha passed the bill on 20 July 2009 and the Lok Sabha on 4 August 2009. It received Presidential assent and was notified as law on 26 August 2009 as The Children's Right to Free and Compulsory Education Act. The law came into effect in the whole of India except the state of Jammu and Kashmir from 1 April 2010, the first time in the history of India a law was brought into force by a speech by the then Prime Minister Manmohan Singh. In his speech, Dr. Singh stated, "We are committed to ensuring that all children, irrespective of gender and social category, have access to education. An education that enables them to acquire the skills, knowledge, values and attitudes necessary to become responsible and active citizens of India." It has now come into force in Jammu and Kashmir after its reorganisation into a Union Territory of India in 2019.

The RTE Act provides for the right of children to free and compulsory education till completion of elementary education in a neighbourhood school. It clarifies that ‘compulsory education’ means obligation of the appropriate government to provide free elementary education and ensure compulsory admission, attendance and completion of elementary education to every child in the six to fourteen age group. ‘Free’ means that no child shall be liable to pay any kind of fee or charges or expenses which may prevent him or her from pursuing and completing elementary education.

It makes provisions for a non-admitted child to be admitted to an age-appropriate class.

It specifies the duties and responsibilities of appropriate Governments, local authority and parents in providing free and compulsory education, and sharing of financial and other responsibilities between the Central and State Governments.

It lays down the norms and standards relating inter alia to pupil-teacher ratios (PTRs), buildings and infrastructure, school-working days, teacher-working hours.

It provides for rational deployment of teachers by ensuring that the specified pupil-teacher ratio is maintained for each school, rather than just as an average for the State or District or Block, thus ensuring that there is no urban-rural imbalance in teacher postings. It also provides for prohibition of deployment of teachers for non-educational work, other than decennial census, elections to local authority, state legislatures and parliament, and disaster relief.

It provides for appointment of appropriately trained teachers, i.e. teachers with the requisite entry and academic qualifications.

It prohibits (a) physical punishment and mental harassment; (b) screening procedures for admission of children; (c) capitation fee; (d) private tuition by teachers and (e) running of schools without recognition.

It provides for development of curriculum in consonance with the values enshrined in the Constitution, and which would ensure the all-round development of the child, building on the child's knowledge, potentiality and talent and making the child free of fear, trauma and anxiety through a system of child friendly and child centered learning.

Highlights 
The RTE act requires surveys that will monitor all neighbourhoods, identify children requiring education, and set up facilities for providing it.
The World Bank education specialist for India, Sam Carlson, has observed:
 The RTE Act is the first legislation in the world that puts the responsibility of ensuring enrolment, attendance and completion on the Government.  It is the parents' responsibility to send the children to schools in the US and other countries.
The Right to Education of persons with disabilities until 18 years of age is laid down under a separate legislation- the Persons with Disabilities Act. A number of other provisions regarding improvement of school infrastructure, teacher-student ratio and faculty are made in the Act.

Implementation and funding
Education in the Indian constitution is a concurrent issue and both centre and states can legislate on the issue. The Act lays down specific responsibilities for the centre, state and local bodies for its implementation. The states have been clamouring that they lack financial capacity to deliver education of appropriate standard in all the schools needed for universal education. Thus it is clear that the central government (which collects most of the revenue) will be required to subsidise the states.

A committee set up to study the funds requirement and funding initially estimated that Rs 1710 billion or 1.71 trillion (US$38.2 billion) across five years was required to implement the Act, and in April 2010 the central government agreed to sharing the funding for implementing the law in the ratio of 65 to 35 between the centre and the states, and a ratio of 90 to 10 for the north-eastern states. However, in mid 2010, this figure was upgraded to Rs. 2310 billion, and the center agreed to raise its share to 68%.
There is some confusion on this, with other media reports stating that the centre's share of the implementation expenses would now be 70%. At that rate, most states may not need to increase their education budgets substantially.

A critical development in 2011 has been the decision taken in principle to extend the right to education till Class X (age 16) and into the preschool age range. The CABE committee is in the process of looking into the implications of making these changes.

Advisory Council on Implementation
The Ministry of HRD set up a high-level, 14-member National Advisory Council (NAC) for implementation of the Act. The members include:
 Kiran Karnik, former president of NASSCOM
 Krishna Kumar, former director of the NCERT
 Mrinal Miri, former vice-chancellor of North-East Hill University
 Yogendra Yadav – social scientist. India
Sajit Krishnan Kutty Secretary of The Educators Assisting Children's Hopes (TEACH)India.
 Annie Namala, an activist and head of Centre for Social Equity and Inclusion
Sheikh Abubakr Ahmad, vice-president of Muslim Education Society, Kerala.

Status of implementation
A report on the status of implementation of the Act was released by the Ministry of Human Resource Development on the one-year anniversary of the Act, and again till 2015. The report admits that 1.7 million children in the age group 6-14 remain out of school and there's a shortage of 508,000 teachers country-wide. A shadow report by the RTE Forum, representing the leading education networks in the country led by Ambarish Rai (a prominent activist), however, challenging the findings pointing out that several key legal commitments are falling behind schedule. The Supreme Court of India has also intervened to demand implementation of the Act in the Northeast. It has also provided the legal basis for ensuring pay parity between teachers in government and government aided schools

Haryana Government has assigned the duties and responsibilities to Block Elementary Education Officers–cum–Block Resource Coordinators (BEEOs-cum-BRCs) for effective implementation and continuous monitoring of implementation of Right to Education Act in the State.

Precedents
It has been pointed out that the RTE act is not new.  Universal adult franchise in the act was opposed since most of the population was illiterate.  
Article 45 in the Constitution of India was set up as an act:
The state shall endeavour to provide, within a period of ten years from commencement of this Constitution, for free and compulsory education for all children until they complete the age of fourteen years. As that deadline was about to be passed many decades ago, the education minister at the time, M C Chagla, memorably said: 
Our Constitution fathers did not intend that we just set up hovels, put students there, give untrained teachers, give them bad textbooks, no playgrounds, and say, we have complied with Article 45 and primary education is expanding... They meant that real education should be given to our children between the ages of 6 and 14 – M.C. Chagla, 1964

In the 1990s, the World Bank funded a number of measures to set up schools within easy reach of rural communities.  This effort was consolidated in the Sarva Shiksha Abhiyan model in the 1990s. RTE takes the process further, and makes the enrolment of children in schools a state prerogative.

Criticism
The act has been criticised for being hastily drafted, not consulting many groups active in education, not considering the quality of education, infringing on the rights of private and religious minority schools to administer their system, and for excluding children under six years of age. Many of the ideas are seen as continuing the policies of Sarva Shiksha Abhiyan of the 2000s, and the World Bank funded District Primary Education Programme DPEP of the '90s, both of which, while having set up a number of schools in rural areas, have been criticised for being ineffective and corruption-ridden.

The quality of education provided by the government school system is not good. While it remains the largest provider of elementary education in the country, forming 80% of all recognised schools, it suffers from shortage of teachers and infrastructural gaps.  Several habitations lack schools altogether. There are also frequent allegations of government schools being riddled with absenteeism and mismanagement and of appointments made on political convenience. Despite the allure of free lunch in the government schools, many parents send their children to private schools. Average schoolteacher salaries in private rural schools in some States (about Rs. 4,000 per month) are considerably lower than those in government schools. As a result, the proponents of low-cost private schools critique the government schools as being poor value for money.

Children attending the private schools are seen to be at an advantage,  forming a discrimination against the weakest sections who are forced to go to government schools. Furthermore, the system has been criticised as catering to the rural elites who are able to afford school fees in a country where a large number of families live in absolute poverty.
The act has been criticised as discriminatory for not addressing these issues. Well-known educationist Anil Sadgopal said of the hurriedly drafted act: 
It is a fraud on our children. It gives neither free education nor compulsory education. In fact, it only legitimises the present multi-layered, inferior quality school education system where discrimination shall continue to prevail.

Entrepreneur Gurcharan Das noted that 54% of urban children attend private schools, and this rate is growing at 3% per year. "Even the poor children are abandoning the government schools. They are leaving because the teachers are not showing up." However, other researchers have countered the argument by saying that the evidence for higher standard of quality in private schools often disappears when other factors (like family income and parental literacy) are accounted for.

Public-private partnership
To address these quality issues, the Act has provisions for compensating private schools for admission of children under the 25% quota which has been compared to school vouchers, whereby parents may "send" their children in any school, private or public. This measure, along with the increase in PPP (Public Private Partnership) has been viewed by some organisations such as the All-India Forum for Right to Education (AIF-RTE), as the state abdicating its "constitutional obligation towards providing elementary education".

Infringement on private schools
The Society for Un-aided Private Schools, Rajasthan (in Writ Petition (Civil) No. 95 of 2010) and as many as 31 others petitioned the Supreme Court of India claiming that the act violates the constitutional right of private managements to run their institutions without governmental interference. The parties claimed that providing 25 percent reservation for disadvantaged children in government and private unaided schools is "unconstitutional".

Forcing unaided schools to admit 25% disadvantaged students has also been criticized on the grounds that the government has partly transferred its constitutional obligation to provide free and compulsory elementary education to children on “non-state actors,” like private schools but collected a 2% of the total tax payable for primary education.

On 12 April 2012, a three judge bench of the Supreme Court delivered its 2-1 judgement. Chief Justice SH Kapadia and Justice Swatanter Kumar held that providing the reservation is not unconstitutional but stated that the Act will not be applicable to private minority schools and boarding schools. However, Justice K. S. Panicker Radhakrishnan dissented with the majority view and held that the Act cannot apply to minority and non-minority private schools that do not receive aid from the government.

In September 2012, the Supreme Court declined a review petition on the Act.

In May 2016, the Chetpet-based CBSE school Maharishi Vidya Mandir became embroiled in a scandal over its circumvention of the 25% quota rule. During its admissions cycle, the school told economically weaker parents "the RTE does not exist' and "we do not take these [government RTE] applications." The senior principal also informed the Tamil Nadu Regional Director of the CBSE that he intended to "reject applicants without an email address" and so excluded technically-illiterate parents from seeking admissions. In addition, school officials falsified the distance figures of several poorer candidates to attempt to disqualify them from availing of the scheme.

In 2017, A public interest litigation was filed in the high courts of both Andhra Pradesh and Telangana, seeking proper implementation of 25% quota in both the states under RTE act. For which the high courts addressed the governments of both states to take necessary steps for the proper implementation of the act.

Barrier for orphans 
The Act provides for admission of children without any certification. However, several states have continued pre-existing procedures insisting that children produce income and caste certificates, BPL cards and birth certificates. Orphan children are often unable to produce such documents, even though they are willing to do so. As a result, schools are not admitting them, as they require the documents as a condition to admission.

References

2009 in education
Education law in India
Children's rights in India
Acts of the Parliament of India 2009
Manmohan Singh administration
Compulsory education